Alzintan Airport  is an airport serving Zintan, a city in the Jabal al Gharbi District in northwest Libya.

Airlines and destinations

See also
Transport in Libya
List of airports in Libya

References

External links
OurAirports - Alzintan Airport

Airports in Libya